Yannick Yenga (born April 10, 1985 in Kinshasa) is a Congolese football striker.

Career
Yenga started his career with Le Mans Union Club 72, but made only two first-team appearance for the club before joining SO Châtellerault in 2005. After scoring 11 goals in the Championnat National, he was signed by Ligue 2 side Dijon FCO. Yenga spent two seasons with Dijon but failed to properly break into the first-team, making just 15 league starts for the club. He subsequently returned to the National with Paris FC and scored 11 times during the 2008–09 season. This led to a move back to Ligue 2 when he signed for FC Tours on 16 June 2009.

However, Yenga again failed to make an impact at the higher level, scoring only two goals in 28 league appearances. In the transfer window of January 2011, he transferred to RC Strasbourg until the end of the 2010–11 season. He left the club in the summer of the same year following their demotion by the DNCG to the Championnat de France amateur 2, the fifth tier of French football. Yenga then returned to Paris FC for the start of the 2011–12 campaign, and scored the first hat-trick of his senior career in the side's 6–0 win against SAS Épinal on 12 October 2011.

Olympiakos Volou 1937 F.C.

2012-13 season

In summer 2012 he moved to Olympiakos Volou 1937 F.C. He scored his first goal against Kavala F.C. in a 2-0 home win. His next goal came against Anagennisi Epanomi F.C. in a 2-0 home win. He also scored against Apollon Smyrni F.C. in a 3-0 home win. Later, he managed to score against Iraklis Thessaloniki F.C. in a 1-0 away win with a powerful shot. His last goal for 2012-2013 season came against Panetolikos F.C. in a 1-2 home loss.

2013-14 season

He started this season by scoring against Glyfada F.C. in a 4-1 home win. His next goal came against Paniliakos F.C. with a header after an assist of Sergio Daniel Ponce

Managerial career
After he retired from playing football, Yenga became a football coach. In November 2020, he was appointed manager of amateurs AS Le Mans Villaret.

References

External links

1985 births
Living people
Democratic Republic of the Congo footballers
Democratic Republic of the Congo international footballers
Democratic Republic of the Congo expatriate footballers
Le Mans FC players
Dijon FCO players
Paris FC players
Tours FC players
RC Strasbourg Alsace players
SO Châtellerault players
Olympiacos Volos F.C. players
Ermis Aradippou FC players
Ligue 1 players
Ligue 2 players
Championnat National players
Cypriot First Division players
Expatriate footballers in Greece
Expatriate footballers in Cyprus
Association football forwards
Footballers from Kinshasa